Swegon Air Academy (SAA) is one of the platform for sharing objective knowledge about the experiences related to air handling, energy and indoor climate issues.

History
Swegon Air Academy was created in 2006, by Conny Nilsson as a platform for the sharing the knowledge with aim to support the Swegon AB company.

Aims
One of the primary goals of Swegon Air Academy is to explain complex relationships in an intelligible way, so that those who are interested in this type of information can understand it at a deeper level.
Via seminars, newspaper articles, literature and website, the Swegon Air Academy contributed to a greater awareness of the importance of indoor air quality for health and well-being, to an increased understanding of the energy issue, and to a higher level of involvement in the outdoor and indoor environment.
The Swegon Air Academy provides information and educational activities all over Europe and cooperates with well-known experts from relevant fields.

External links
 Swegon Air Academy's official website

Companies established in 2006